Rufoclanis erlangeri is a moth of the family Sphingidae. It is known from Somalia, Ethiopia and Kenya.

It is similar to Rufoclanis numosae, but smaller and greyer, with a much better defined postdiscal band in hindwing.

References

Rufoclanis
Moths described in 1903
Fauna of Somalia
Moths of Africa